Cookin’ is the first of three live albums by Swiss drummer Charly Antolini and UK saxophonist Dick Morrissey containing mainly jazz and pop standards. The album was recorded live in Germany in 1989.

Track listing 

"After You've Gone" (Turner Layton, Henry Creamer) 
"My Romance" (Richard Rodgers, Lorenz Hart)
"Jumpin' at the Woodside" (Count Basie)
"My Ship" (Kurt Weill, Ira Gershwin)
"Yesterdays" (Otto Harbach, Jerome Kern)
"Dick's Blues" (Dick Morrissey)
"Soon" (George Gershwin, Ira Gershwin)
"Tickle Toe" (Louis Hirsch)
"Like Someone in Love" (Jimmy Van Heusen, Johnny Burke)
"Perdido" (Juan Tizol)
"Lady Be Good" (George Gershwin, Ira Gershwin)

Personnel 

Charly Antolini - drums
Dick Morrissey - tenor saxophone
Brian Lemon - piano
Len Skeat - bass

References 

Dick Morrissey albums
1989 live albums